Light Records is a gospel record label founded in 1966 by Ralph Carmichael, as a joint venture with the Waco, Texas-based Word Records. It is a subsidiary of the MNRK Music Group.

History 
Light Records' first roster included Ralph Carmichael, the Carmichael Young People, Ralph Carmichael's 102 Strings recordings, and Ralph's daughter Kim (Carol) Carmichael. Other artists included Jimmy Durante and Thurl Ravenscroft (the voice of Tony the Tiger in cereal commercials). Light moved into Gospel music quickly, with the 1968 signing of future Grammy-winners Andrae Crouch & the Disciples and The Oral Roberts Singers, featuring Richard Roberts (evangelist) who had a hit with their opening theme Something Good Is Going to Happen to You and closing theme A God of Miracles for The Oral Roberts Hour.

Soon other gospel artists, including Kristle Murden, The Archers, The Winans, Walter Hawkins, Tramaine Hawkins and Bob Bailey joined the roster. For a time, Light was also home to contemporary Christian artists such as Sweet Comfort Band, Reba Rambo-McGuire, Jamie Owens, Carman and Paul Porter.

Carmichael bought out Word's portion of Light/Lexicon in 1980, after ABC/CapCities had purchased Word in 1974. Light was then purchased by Platinum Entertainment in 1993. After Platinum filed bankruptcy in 2001, it was renamed Compendia Music Group, and the Light label continued as an urban-gospel label. Compendia was purchased by Sheridan Square Entertainment in 2004.

As of April 2010, Light Records was owned by Entertainment One.

See also 
 List of record labels

References 

MNRK Music Group
American independent record labels
Record labels established in 1966
Gospel music record labels